Throughout its history, BMW cars and motorcycles have been successful in a range of motorsport activities. Apart from the factory efforts, many privateer teams enter BMW road cars in touring car racing. BMW also entered cars or provided engines in Formula One, Formula Two and sportscar racing. BMW is currently active in IMSA, the Isle of Man TT, the North West 200, the Superbike World Championship and the Deutsche Tourenwagen Masters (German Touring Car Championship).

An outstanding role has been played by the 1,500 cc BMW M10 engine block. This engine became wideley regarded as one of the most powerful, if not the most, powerful engine in the history of Formula 1 as well as being the most powerful engine ever built by BMW. As the base of the BMW S14 engine of the original BMW M3, it collected many more wins.

Other impressive displays of engineering involve the production of the BMW S70/2 engine, implemented in the McLaren F1, which set the world record for "world's fastest production car" on March 31, 1998. As well as achieving a Guinness 
Book of World Records record for longest continuous Drift (See Below "Guinness Book of World Records")

Motorcycling

Isle of Man TT 
BMW enjoyed a dominant period in motorcycle racing prior to the Second World War with notable achievements such as Georg Meier's victory in the Senior Race at the 1939 Isle of Man TT. Post war BMW success mainly revolved around Sidecar racing, the marque becoming the premier machinery on the Snaefell Mountain Course, the smaller Clypse Course and from 1949 until the mid 1970s the Sidecar World Championship. BMW-powered sidecars have won numerous World Championships, notable competitors being Rolf Steinhausen, Klaus Enders and Max Deubel. The pre-war dominance enjoyed in motorcycle road racing faded post-war, the main road racing campaign centered on Production Bike Racing with Helmut Dähne campaigning the marque with BMW's best post-war finish until the second decade of the 21st Century being a 3rd-placed position in the 1974 Production 1000cc TT.

BMW officially resumed road racing in 2009, entering the World Superbike Championship with its BMW S1000RR. This resumption also saw its official re-introduction at the Isle of Man TT. The 2014 Isle of Man TT saw Michael Dunlop campaigning BMW machinery in the Superbike, Superstock and Senior TTs. Dunlop took victory in the three main solo races, securing BMW's first win in the Senior TT since that of Georg Meier in 1939. Dunlop again took victory in the 2016 Superbike TT during the process of which he also set a new outright lap record for the Snaefell Mountain Course at 130.306 mph. Peter Hickman claimed the pole and victory at the 2018 Senior TT, setting record average speeds of 135.452 mph and 131.700 mph respectively.

BMW have won 25 Isle of Man TT Sidecar Races and an additional 8 victories in the solo classes. In total BMW have recorded 72 rostrum places at the Isle of Man TT, having notched up a total of 382 finishes.

Dakar Rally 
BMW motorcycles have won the Dakar Rally six times. In 1981, 1983, 1984, 1985, 1999, and 2000.

Superbikes 
In 2009, BMW returned to the Superbike World Championship with their all new superbike, the BMW S1000RR.

Touring cars

In the 1930s, BMW drivers were successful with the BMW 328 two-litre sports car, winning many races including the prestigious Mille Miglia – a class win in 1938 and an outright win (with a streamlined body on a shortened course) in 1940 with Huschke von Hanstein. A Frazer Nash BMW 328 driven by A.F.P. Fane and came in fifth overall (first in its class) in the 1939 24 Hours of Le Mans. In fact, the BMW 328 proved unbeatable in international sports car races in the two-liter class.

Since the pre-war BMW 328 model, BMW had a reputation for sporty production cars. The expensive V8-powered BMW 503 and BMW 507 of the 1950s could not add much to this reputation, unlike the small motorcycle-engine powered BMW 700 which e.g. was driven by Hans Stuck to German championships in hillclimbing.

Since the 1962 introduction of the BMW New Class in 1961, BMW has become one of the most successful marques in touring car racing. The original 1500 cc 4-cylinder BMW M10 engine block was modified to a four-valve design which won championships in Formula 2. Equipped with a turbocharger, the version BMW M12/13 even won the 1983 Formula One championship.

In the 1970s, BMW M GmbH was formed to support the racing efforts. This led to the development of the BMW M1 and in the 1980s to the BMW M3. Having won more road races than any other BMW model in history, the E30 M3 is the world's most successful BMW road race car. Its success was emulated during the Supertouring era in the 1990s, when the 318i and 320i won several touring car national championships, including the BTCC, French Supertouring Championship, Super Tourenwagen Cup, Italian Superturismo and Australian Super Touring Championship.

British Touring Car Championship (BTCC): BMW won the drivers' championship in 1988, 1991, 1992, 1993, 2009, 2014, 2018, and 2019 and manufacturers' championship in 1991, 1993, 2016, 2017, 2018, 2019,  2020, and 2021.

The DRM (Deutsche Rennsport Meisterschaft) was won by Harald Ertl in a BMW 320i Turbo in 1978.

In the DTM (Deutsche Tourenwagen Meisterschaft), the following BMW drivers have won the DTM drivers' championship:

 1987: Eric van der Poele, BMW M3
 1989: Roberto Ravaglia, BMW M3
 2012: Bruno Spengler, BMW M3 DTM
2014 and 2016 Marco Wittmann, BMW M4 DTM
2022 Sheldon van der Linde, BMW M4 GT3

European Touring Car Championship (ETCC): Since 1968, BMW won 24 drivers' championships along with several manufacturers' and teams' titles.

Japanese Touring Car Championship (JTCC): BMW (Schnitzer) flew from Europe to Japan to compete in the JTCC and won the championship in 1995.

SCCA Pro Racing World Challenge Touring Car Series(WC): BMW won the manufacturer's championship in 2001 and Bill Auberlen, driving a Turner Motorsport BMW 325i, won the 2003 and 2004 Driver's Championships.

BMW announced on 15 October 2010 that it will return to touring car racing during the 2012 season. Dr. Klaus Draeger, director of research and development of the BMW Group, who was in charge of the return to DTM racing (Deutsche Tourenwagen Masters), commented that "The return of BMW to the DTM is a fundamental part of the restructuring of our motorsport activities. With its increased commitment to production car racing, BMW is returning to its roots. The race track is the perfect place to demonstrate the impressive sporting characteristics of our vehicles against our core competitors in a high-powered environment. The DTM is the ideal stage on which to do this."

1987, 2005–2010: World Touring Car Championship
In 1987 Roberto Ravaglia drove a Schnitzer E30 M3 to victory in the World Touring Car Championship, winning the title by a single point.

2005 saw Andy Priaulx take the drivers title, and BMW take the manufacturers title, this time not with an M3, but the E46 320i. Priaulx's car raced under the banner of BMW Team UK and was run by RBM. Schnitzer Motorsport ran the BMW Team Germany entries, also E46 320i's, driven by Dirk Müller and Jörg Müller. Previous WTCC winner Roberto Ravaglia also ran two cars for the BMW Team Italy/Spain, with Alessandro Zanardi and Antonio García as the drivers. BMW also took the top four places in the independent category.

2006 saw the new E90 320si, again it saw BMW take the manufacturers trophy, and again BMW Team UK/RBM driver Andy Priaulx won the drivers championship. BMW Team Germany returned with both Dirk and Jörg Müller. BMW Team Italy/Spain retained Alessandro Zanardi, but now had Marcel Costa driving the second car, later to be substituted for Duncan Huisman. Priaulx again won the title in 2007, but BMW were beaten by SEAT in the following two seasons, despite adding Augusto Farfus to their roster.

In 2010 BMW reduced their presence in the WTCC, entering only two cars under the BMW Team RBM banner, with works drivers Andy Priaulx and Augusto Farfus.  With Chevrolet dominating most of the races, BMW struggled and finished only third in the manufacturers standings.  In the drivers standings Priaulx finished the season 4th, with Farfus in 7th.  Better luck was had in the Independents Trophy category though, with Sergio Hernández taking the championship behind the wheel of a BMW 320Si.

BMW withdrew from the WTCC at the end of the 2010 season leaving only independents to represent BMW in the championship.

Formula Two

1950–1984
BMW pilots used the sporty pre-war BMW 328 model as the basis for early post-war efforts in the Formula Two series, a stepping stone to Formula One; the 328 occasionally participated in F1 races. BMW ran its own team, but other smaller teams such as Veritas, AFM, Jicey and even East Germany-based EMW also used cars derived from the 328 or its two-litre six-cylinder engine. However, after the death of the initial F2 series in 1955 and its resurrection the following year, BMW's management decided not to participate in expensive open wheel racing.

In 1967, the Formula 2 regulations were changed to allow 1600 cc motors, and BMW's new management was more open to the idea of open wheel racing. The BMW M10 block with a radial four-valve cylinder head designed by Ludwig Apfelbeck was used for some time. In the 1968 season, the company joined with Lola, using their 100 chassis. BMW sponsored drivers Jo Siffert and Hubert Hahne. For 1969, the team switched to Lola 102s, and used a new development of BMW's 1600 cc engine, dubbed the M12. Siffert and Hahne remained; Gerhard Mitter and Dieter Quester shared a third car. Halfway through the season, BMW debuted their own chassis, the 269, at the Hockenheimring. However, Mitter was killed in the 269 during practise for the 1969 German Grand Prix at the Nürburgring where F2 could race along F1 due to the length of that track. As technical failure was suspected, all BMW entries were retired.

For the 1970 F2 season, BMW debuted the 270 chassis, and campaigned with Jo Siffert, Hubert Hahne, Dieter Quester, and Jacky Ickx. However, in 1971, BMW's involvement was pulled back, with the team only supplying engines for Dieter Quester's Eifelland. With a change in the F2 engine regulations to 2000 cc production-based engines, BMW went on hiatus for the 1972 season.

When BMW's returned to F2 in 1973, the company again supplied only engines. Although officially backing the March team's effort for drivers Jean-Pierre Beltoise and Jean-Pierre Jarier, they also supplied engines for teams such as Beta Racing (with German Hans-Joachim Stuck) and Brian Lewis Racing. From 1973 to the end of Formula 2 in 1984, BMW supplied engines to the championship-winning drivers in 1973, 1974, 1975, 1978, 1979, and 1982.

Formula One

BMW has a history of success in Formula One. BMW powered cars have won 20 races. In 2006 BMW took over the Sauber team and became Formula One constructors. In 2007 and 2008 the team enjoyed some success. The most recent win is a lone constructor team's victory by BMW Sauber F1 Team, on 8 June 2008, at the Canadian Grand Prix with Robert Kubica driving. Achievements include:
 Driver championship: 1 (1983)
 Constructor championship: 0 (Runner-up 2002, 2003, 2007)
 Fastest laps: 33
 Grand Prix wins: 20
 Podium finishes: 76
 Pole positions: 33

BMW was an engine supplier to Williams, Benetton, Brabham, and Arrows. Notable drivers who have started their Formula One careers with BMW include Jenson Button, Juan Pablo Montoya, Robert Kubica, and Sebastian Vettel.

1980–1987
In 1980, BMW announced their development of a turbocharged motor for the Brabham F1 team. The BMW M12 engine first raced in the 1982 season. The M12/13 engine won at the 1982 Canadian Grand Prix at the hands of Nelson Piquet; Riccardo Patrese was the team's other driver. The following season, BMW supplied engines to the ATS team; the factory-backed Brabham took four victories on its way to Piquet's championship win. Two more victories came in 1984, and BMW added Arrows to its list of teams who received its engines. In 1985, Piquet's Brabham, who was now teamed with Marc Surer, managed only one win.

In 1986, BMW started to supply engines for the new Benetton team, who earned the only win for a BMW engine at the hands of Gerhard Berger. However, the factory-backed effort at Brabham met with little success with the return of Patrese and Derek Warwick. At the end of the 1986 season, BMW announced it would drop out of Formula 1 at the end of the 1987 season.

BMW's M12/13 engine, however, continued to be used, because Megatron bought the rights to the engines for the Arrows team. The Ligier team was also supplied with the engine for the 1987 season. Following the 1988 season, turbocharged motors were banned, and Arrows ended its use of the former BMW engine.

This engine had a bore and stroke of  x , giving a displacement of 1,499.79 cc. Maximum crankshaft speed was 11,200 rpm. Peak power b.m.e.p. was in the region of 1,000 lbs/sq.in.

1997–2005: Return to Formula One via Le Mans

In 1997, BMW announced that it had formed a partnership with Williams Grand Prix Engineering in order to provide V10 engines in 2000. The initial development of this partnership was BMW's sports car effort. Chassis built by Williams powered by a BMW M70 V12 engines were entered by long-time partner team Schnitzer Motorsport. The rather unsuccessful 1998 model was improved, and the efforts culminated in BMW's victory at the 1999 24 Hours of Le Mans with the BMW V12 LMR. Additional success came in the 2000 ALMS series before the cars were retired from racing.

Following the win, the second stage of BMW's partnership with Williams began, with BMW developing the powerful E41 V10 for Formula 1. The new Williams-BMW debuted in the 2000 season, driven by Ralf Schumacher and Jenson Button. In 2001, Schumacher took 3 wins and newcomer Juan Pablo Montoya took his first win. A lone win for Schumacher followed in 2002, but Williams-BMW returned to success in 2003, with two wins each for Schumacher and Montoya. Montoya was the lone winner in 2004.

In 2005, disputes led to a rapid decline in the partnership of BMW and Williams. Constant disagreements over the cause of technical failures in the car led BMW to discontinue development of the P84/5 V10 as the season progressed, leading to no victories for the team's new driver line-up of Mark Webber and Nick Heidfeld. Consequently, the car finished a distant 5th in the constructors' championship.

2006–2009: BMW Sauber F1

Wanting a split from their failing relationship with Williams, BMW's executives decided that adding an F1 team to the company's motorsport division, thus removing the necessity for a partner, was the only viable solution. Enticed by Sauber's new multimillion-dollar research and development facility, which included an advanced wind tunnel setup, BMW choose to offer a buyout to Peter Sauber rather than scramble to build the facilities themselves. The team being split between the Sauber facility at Hinwil, Switzerland and BMW in Munich.

The BMW Sauber F1.06 was relatively successful, earning the team fifth place in the constructors championship. BMW opted to retain BMW Williams driver Nick Heidfeld for 2006 alongside contracted Sauber driver Jacques Villeneuve. Villeneuve was later replaced by Polish driver Robert Kubica after disagreements between Villeneuve and the team.

BMW's 2007 season improved on results from the previous year. While the car was still inferior to both the Ferrari and McLaren, it outclassed the rest of the field. BMW scored points in every race, ending the season second in the constructors championship (after McLaren's disqualification) with over 100 points. In 2008 BMW won their first race at the Canadian Grand Prix. The team also achieved several podium finishes like Heidfeld's at the first race of the season in Australia and a second place for Kubica in Monte Carlo.

In July 2009, BMW announced that it would withdraw from Formula One at the end of the 2009 season. The team was sold back to the previous owner, Peter Sauber, who kept the BMW part of the name for the 2010 season due to issues with the Concorde Agreement. The team has since dropped BMW from their name starting in 2011.

Formula E 

BMW will join Formula E as an official manufacturer for season 5. The German performance car giant has confirmed that it will build a brand new powertrain to be used by the Andretti team in the 2018/19 season. The team's drivers for the season will be António Félix da Costa and Alexander Sims.

DTM (Deutsche Tourenwagen Masters)

2012– 

BMW returned to the DTM for the 2012 season with the M3 DTM, which is based (visually at least) on the contemporary BMW E92 M3 Coupe.  Three teams lined up on the grid for BMW as follows:

Canadian driver Bruno Spengler recorded the first DTM win for BMW in 20 years at the second race of the 2012 season, held at the Lausitzring circuit in Germany.  Spengler then went on to claim the 2012 drivers championship.  BMW claimed the 2012 manufacturers championship with 346 points, 11 points ahead of Audi and 17 points ahead of Mercedes-Benz.  BMW Team Schnitzer earned the 2012 teams championship title.  All three of these titled were clinched by BMW at the last race of the season at Hockenheim.

2013–2020 
BMW clinched its second consecutive manufacturers' championship in 2013 at the season finale at the Hockenheimring, after a close fight with Audi all season. Drivers' honors went to Audi driver Mike Rockenfeller; teams' to Audi Sport Team Phoenix. BMW claimed a spectacular 1-2-3 podium sweep at the Red Bull Ring in Salzburg, Austria with Bruno Spengler leading home Marco Wittmann and Timo Glock. BMW also locked out the first two rows in qualifying for the finale at Hockenheim. BMW secured 51 total DTM victories with the BMW M3, and switched to the new M4 DTM for the 2014 season onwards.

Formula BMW 

In the 1990s, the Formula BMW was introduced as feeder series, with small cars powered by BMW K motorcycle engines. Former drivers were e.g. Ralf Schumacher and Nico Rosberg. Formula BMW has since expanded to encompass four championships across three continents. The German series was followed by a south-east Asian championship in 2003, and series in the United Kingdom and the United States were launched the following year. The UK and German championships will be merged into a new pan-European series in 2008.

Le Mans
1939 saw the BMW 328 finish first in its class (fifth overall) in the 1939 24 Hours of Le Mans completing 236 laps.

After 33 years in 1972, a BMW entered the competition for the first time by Schnitzer Motorsport with the BMW 2800CS. In the following years, BMW became a common contender in the 24 Hours of Le Mans, represented by private teams racing BMW race cars in the competition from 1972 till 1989, and from 1993 till 2000 and by teams using BMW engines, most successful the McLaren F1 GTR who won the 24 Hours of Le Mans in 1995 with a BMW S70 6.1L V12 engine.

Also BMW Motorsport started with the BMW 3.0 CSL (1973), BMW 3.5 CSL (1976), BMW M1 (1980, 1981), McLaren F1 GTR (1996, 1997), BMW V12 LM (1998), BMW V12 LMR. The latter car, designed by Williams Grand Prix Engineering and entered by Schnitzer Motorsport, won the 1999 24 Hours of Le Mans overall against factory competition from Audi, Toyota, Mercedes-Benz, Nissan and others.

American Le Mans Series – BMW has won three (2001, 2010, 2011) GT Team Championships and GT Automobile Manufacturer titles. Twice (2010, 2011) with Team RLL in the Crowne Plaza V8 powered M3 GT coupe and once (2001) with the BMW Motorsport team in the V8 powered M3 GTR.

Endurance racing 
 Nürburgring – BMW won the 24 Hours Nürburgring 19 times and the 1000km Nürburgring twice (1976 and 1981).
 A BMW works team E36 320d was the first diesel-powered overall winner ever at the 24 Hours Nürburgring.
 24 Hours of Daytona – BMW has won five times (1976, 2011, 2013, 2019, 2020)
 Spa 24 Hours – BMW won 21 times
 McLaren F1 GTR – Successful mid-1990s GT racing car with a BMW designed engine. It won the BPR Global GT Series in 1995 and 1996 and the 24 Hours of Le Mans in 1995.

Rally 
 RAC Rally – The 328 sport car won this event in 1939.
 Tour de Corse – The BMW M3 E30 won this event in 1987.

Guinness Book of World Records 
On May 11, 2013, BMW placed itself in the Guinness Book of World Records for longest drift after deciding that they wanted the record "back in the US". Johan Shwartz achieved a 51.3 mile continuous drift on a skidpad in the BMW F10 M5, ultimately breaking Abdo Feghali's world record of 11,180 metres (approximately 6.95 miles) that was achieved in a Chevrolet Camaro, in Abu Dhabi.

Other events 
BMW had various touring and sportscar successes throughout the rest of the 1980s and 1990s following its exit from Formula One. In 1986, BMW North America also ran the BMW GTP in the IMSA GT Championship, with little success.

Since 1987, The Kumho BMW Championship has also existed, which is a BMW-exclusive motorsport championship. It is operated and run in the UK, with some races occasionally taking part in the Europe mainland. 2005 saw the BMW Challenge join as a class within the Kumho BMW Championship only to leave a year later to become a standalone UK Championship called The BMW Production Championship. In 2008, a split between the committee and the organising club (CTCRC) saw it lose its championship status and a breakaway PBMW Cup was formed.

Automatic Racing had entered a BMW M6 into the 2008 Rolex Sports Car Series season, driven by an all American team consisting of Jep Thorton, Tom Long, Joe Varde and David Russell. Turner Motorsport entered a BMW M6 for the 2010 season, followed by two BMW M3s from 2011-2013. They have racked up six Rolex GT wins and 24 top ten finishes in the GT class, including rare double class wins for the GT M3 and GS M3 at the Circuit of the Americas round in 2013.

Pictures

References